Breaking Fast is a 2020 American romantic comedy film, directed by Mike Mosallam and released in 2020. An expansion of Mosallam's 2015 short film of the same title, the film stars Haaz Sleiman as Mo, a gay Muslim doctor in Los Angeles who is emotionally closed off following a painful breakup with his former partner Hassan (Patrick Sabongui); on the first day of Ramadan he meets Kal (Michael Cassidy), getting to know him over nightly iftars.

The film premiered on March 7, 2020 at the Cinequest Film & Creativity Festival; due to the COVID-19 pandemic, it was screened digitally by several LGBT film festivals through the next several months. It was picked up for commercial distribution by Vertical Entertainment in August 2020.

Cast 
 Haaz Sleiman as Mo
 Michael Cassidy as Kal
 Amin El Gamal as Sam
 Patrick Sabongui as Hassan
 Christopher J. Hanke as John
 Rula Gardenier as Mama
 Veronica Cartwright as Judy
 Aline Elasmar as Muna

Reception

Critical response

Accolades

References

External links
 
 

2020 romantic comedy films
2020 films
2020 LGBT-related films
American romantic comedy films
American LGBT-related films
LGBT-related romantic comedy films
Gay-related films
Films about LGBT and Islam
2020s English-language films
2020s American films